Save Yourself may refer to:

Music

Albums
 Save Yourself (McAuley Schenker Group album), 1989
 Save Yourself (Speedway album), 2004
 Save Yourself (The Make-Up album), 1999
 Save Yourself, a 2016 album by SBTRKT

Songs
 "Save Yourself" (Stabbing Westward song), 1998
 "Save Yourself" (The Chainsmokers and Nghtmre song), 2018
 "Save Yourself", the title track from McAuley Schenker Group's 1989 album
 "Save Yourself", the title track from Speedway's 2004 album
 "Save Yourself", the title track from The Make-Up's 1999 album
 "Save Yourself, I'll Hold Them Back", a song by My Chemical Romance from Danger Days: The True Lives of the Fabulous Killjoys
 "Save Yourself", a song by One Ok Rock, 2022

Television and film
 "Save Yourself" (True Blood), an episode of True Blood
 Save Yourself (film), a 2015 Canadian horror film